Sialic acid-binding Ig-like lectin 9 is a protein that in humans is encoded by the SIGLEC9 gene.

References

Further reading